Victory Monument is a military monument in Bangkok, Thailand. The monument was erected in June 1941 to commemorate the Thai victory in the Franco-Thai War. The monument is in Ratchathewi District, northeast of central Bangkok, at the center of a traffic circle in the intersection of Phahonyothin, Phaya Thai and Ratchawithi roads.

Design

The monument is entirely Western in design. This is in contrast with another prominent monument of Bangkok, the Democracy Monument, which uses indigenous Thai forms and symbols. The central obelisk, although originally Egyptian, has been frequently used in Europe and the US for national and military memorials, its shape suggesting both a sword and masculine potency. Here it is executed in the shape of five bayonets clasped together. Five statues, representing the army, navy, air force, police, and civilian population, are depicted in Western "heroic" style, familiar in the 1940s in both fascist and communist states. They were created by the Italian sculptor Corrado Feroci, who worked under the Thai name Silpa Bhirasi. The sculptor did not like the combination of his work with the obelisk, and referred to the monument as "the victory of embarrassment".

History
In 1940–1941, Thailand fought a brief conflict against the Vichy French colonial authorities in French Indochina, this conflict was called the Franco-Thai War, which resulted in Thailand annexing some territories in western Cambodia and northern and southern Laos. These were among the territories which the Kingdom of Siam had ceded to France in 1893 and 1904, and nationalist Thais considered them to belong to Thailand.

The fighting between the Thais and the French in December 1940 and January 1941 was brief and inconclusive. 54 Thai troops were killed, with the French sustaining 421 killed or wounded. In the final territorial settlement was imposed on both parties by Japan, which did not want to see a prolonged war between two regional allies at a time when it was preparing to launch a war of conquest in Southeast Asia. Thailand's gains were less than it had hoped for, although more than the French wished to concede. Nevertheless, the Thai regime of Field Marshal Plaek Phibunsongkhram celebrated the outcome of the war as a victory, and the monument was commissioned, designed, and erected within a few months.

 in a more political sense in 1945 when the Allies were victorious in the Pacific War they forced Thailand to evacuate the territories it had gained in 1941 and return them to France. Many Thais regard the monument as an inappropriate symbol of militarism and a relic of what they now see as a discredited regime. Nevertheless, the monument remains one of Bangkok's most familiar landmarks.

References

External links

Monuments and memorials in Thailand
Buildings and structures in Bangkok
Tourist attractions in Bangkok
Military history of Thailand during World War II
Buildings and structures completed in 1941
Ratchathewi district
1941 establishments in Thailand
Road junctions in Bangkok
Unregistered ancient monuments in Bangkok